Marie Anne of Austria (Maria Anna Franziska Theresia Josepha Medarde; 8 June 1804 – 28 December 1858) was an Archduchess of Austria as the daughter of Franz II, Holy Roman Emperor and his second wife, Maria Theresa of Naples and Sicily. She never married or had any children due to her being intellectually disabled with a severe facial deformity and having to spend the rest of her life in Hetzendorf Palace.

Biography

Marie Anne was born on 8 June 1804 at the Hofburg Palace in Vienna. She was the tenth child born to her parents. Her mother, Maria Theresa, died after giving birth to her only younger sister Archduchess Amalie Theresa who died with their mother in 1807.

She is said to have been intellectually disabled (like her eldest brother, Emperor Ferdinand I) and to have a severe facial deformity.

After living in the Schönbrunn Palace, she was moved in 1835 to Hetzendorf Palace, where she spent the rest of her life, and where she died on 28 December 1858.

Marie Anne was buried at the Capuchin Church in Vienna, more specifically in the Imperial Crypt, the burial place of her siblings Marie Louise, Duchess of Parma, Ferdinand I of Austria, Archduchess Marie Caroline, Archduchess Caroline Ludovika of Austria, Archduke Johann Nepomuk of Austria, Archduchess Amalie Theresa of Austria, and Archduke Franz Karl of Austria. Her parents, Francis II, Holy Roman Emperor and Maria Theresa of Naples and Sicily, and her great-grandmother, Maria Theresa of Austria, are also buried there.

Ancestry

References

External links

Austrian princesses
House of Habsburg-Lorraine
Austrian Roman Catholics
Nobility from Vienna
1804 births
1858 deaths
Royalty and nobility with disabilities
Daughters of emperors
Burials at the Imperial Crypt
Children of Francis II, Holy Roman Emperor
Daughters of kings